The 2017 Finns Party leadership election was held in Jyväskylä, Finland, on June 10, 2017, to elect the new chair of the Finns Party. All members of the party who had paid their subscription were allowed to vote in the election.

The incumbent party chair Timo Soini, who had led the party since 1997, did not run for the leadership this time. MEP
Jussi Halla-aho and Sampo Terho, Minister for European Affairs, Culture and Sport, were considered the strongest candidates to succeed him. Leena Meri and Veera Ruoho, two Members of the Finnish Parliament, and Riku Nevanpää, a local politician, also ran for party chair. Raimo Rautiola, another local politician, initially stood for election but pulled out of the race on 5 June.

The election was won by Halla-aho who received 949 votes in the first round, 56% of the total vote. Terho received 629 votes. In addition, Laura Huhtasaari was chosen as the first deputy leader, while Teuvo Hakkarainen and Juho Eerola won the races for second and third deputy leaders of the party, respectively. The incumbent party secretary Riikka Slunga-Poutsalo maintained her position after a vote.

These selections were characterised by newspaper Helsingin Sanomat as a takeover by the anti-immigration wing of the Finns party, from the allegedly more moderate followers of the former leader Soini. Halla-aho's rise to power was described as a "unique event in Finnish political history" by the Prime Minister and Centre leader Juha Sipilä. According to Bloomberg News, the results of the leadership election put the future of the ruling coalition in jeopardy. On 12 June, both Sipilä and NCP leader Petteri Orpo tweeted that in their view, they could not carry on co-operating with Halla-aho-led Finns Party. On 13 June, twenty Members of Parliament left the Finns Party parliamentary group and formed a new group of their own, called New Alternative (which later became a party called Blue Reform). Included in this group of defectors were former leader and current Foreign Minister Soini, as well as all the other Finns Party Ministers (Terho, Jari Lindström, Jussi Niinistö, Pirkko Mattila) and Speaker of Parliament Maria Lohela.

Notable endorsements

Jussi Halla-aho
Teuvo Hakkarainen, MP for Central Finland.
Laura Huhtasaari, MP for Satakunta. 
Olli Immonen, MP for Oulu.

Sampo Terho
Jari Lindström, Minister for Labour, MP for South-Eastern Finland.
Maria Lohela, Speaker of the Parliament, MP for Finland Proper.
Jussi Niinistö, Minister for Defence, MP for Uusimaa.

Opinion polls

Results

See also

 2017 Finnish government crisis
 Politics of Finland

References

Further reading 

Finns Party
2017 in Finland
Political party leadership elections in Finland
Finns Party leadership election